Xinhua South railway station is a railway station on the Changsha–Kunming section of the Shanghai–Kunming high-speed railway. It is located in Shuanghua Village, Yangxi Town, Xinhua County, Loudi, Hunan, People's Republic of China. The total area of the station is 11,499 square meters. The station is designed to have a maximum flow of over 5000 passengers a day.

References 

Railway stations in Hunan
Railway stations in Loudi